Eva Moll (born June 15, 1975, in Karlsruhe) is a German contemporary artist. Moll works in the media fine art printmaking, drawing and painting and its expansion in the areas of performance art and conceptual art. Beside works on canvas and paper; Happening, video art and installation count to her Œuvre. A large part of her work stands in the traditions of appropriation art, pop art, fluxus and action painting. She lives and works in New York and Berlin.

Life and work
As a student Eva Moll took weekend courses at the Städelschule in Frankfurt am Main in 1989. After her German preparatory school graduation in 1994 at the Rudolf Koch School in Offenbach am Main, she completed a one-year internship at the fine art painter and restorer Manfred Scharpf at the Castle Zeil in Leutkirch im Allgäu. There she acquired knowledge to old master techniques and processes in the studio and exhibition making.

From 1995 Eva Moll studied at the Kunsthochschule Kassel in Germany in the fields of visual communication and fine arts. Her study focus was on free graphics, drawing and painting with old and new media and interdisciplinary art. While studying Moll realized the global multi-media project: "The Ornamental Symbol" on traveling in Europe, Asia, Africa and America (1996–1998). This was followed by the urban visual diary project "Eva in The Big Apple" in New York City (1998–2000). 2000 Eva Moll graduated with an artistic university degree (M.f.A.) under the Professors Walter Rabe and Paul Driessen.

In 2000 Moll migrated to New York. From 2000 to 2002 she worked as an assistant in the studio of American pop-artist Peter Max. In 2001 Moll had her first show at the La Mama Gallery in the Lower East Side. In 2002 she launched her first studio in New York after touring Los Angeles, San Francisco, Big Sur, Portland, Oregon, and Seattle. In 2003 she founded the collective art group Galaxy Girls NYC. Since then the visual artist with curatorial practice organized exhibitions and happenings in interdisciplinary space. Moll is active in the public space of major cities as well as in the specialized areas of trade fairs, museums, galleries, art associations and in various groups of the international art market and art scene.

In 2006 Moll traveled with her project Europe ArtTourIsm to Athens, Barcelona, Budapest, Copenhagen and Luxembourg. In 2007 she performed unofficially with her artistic figure EVE at the openings of the art fairs Documenta 12, at the Armory Show in New York and at the Art Forum Berlin. That same year, she expanded her activities as a studio artist and exhibition maker in the New York Metropolitan Area to the Rhine-Main area of Germany. 2009 Moll became an active member in the international art club Kunstverein Familie Montez in Frankfurt am Main. In 2011 she was appointed professor of contemporary art at the Academy of Interdisciplinary Processes in Offenbach am Main. 2012 Moll got honored for the project Schrankstipendium with an art award by the maecenia Frankfurt  - Foundation for Women in Science and Arts. With the guerrilla-performance of her art figure EVE Moll provided at the opening of the dOCUMENTA (13) in Kassel Germany for sensation. Moll is chairman of the New York organization Arts in Action. Since 2013 Moll tours with the art figure EVE performances and exhibitions in Rome, Florence, Cinque Terre, Monaco, Paris, Berlin, London, Chicago, Miami and New York. In 2014 she moved with her German studio to Berlin. Her American studio remains in New York.

Exhibitions and performances (selection) 
 2000: "Eva Moll. Eva in The Big Apple", Kunsthochschule Kassel (graduation exhibit)
 2001: "Iluminati", La Mama La Galleria, New York NY (First exhibit in New York)
 2007: EVE Performance at the Art Forum Berlin
 2009–2012: Participation of exhibitions and performances at the Kunstverein Familie Montez, Frankfurt am Main
 2010: "Das Gute von gestern", Catalogue at the Deutsche National Bibliothek
 2011: "Painting the town", Armory Show Week, New York NY (EVE Performance)
 2012: "Neue Welten. Perspektiven aktueller Kunst", Kunsthallen Offenbach am Main
 2013: "Facebook",  booth installation of the Cloisters Gallery at the Fountain Art at The Armory, New York NY
 2013–2014: Participation of the travel exhibition in Germany "Wurzeln weit mehr Aufmerksamkeit widmen" of the Kunstverein Familie Montez, Frankfurt am Main
 2013: "Gifted Art", Michael Mut Gallery, New York NY
 2014: "EVE – Die Kunst von Eva Moll", Kunstverein Offenbach am Main
 2014: "I'm going out for a coffee honey...", Galerie Villa Köppe, Berlin
 2014: "La Costola Ingombrante di Adamo", Atelier Montez, Rome
 2015: "THE LIGHT OF ART IS IN YOUR HEART", Art von Frei Gallery, Berlin/ Germany

References

External links 

 
 Kunstaspekte with exhibition list
 Profil of the Fine Art Adoption Network
 Profile at ArtSlant
 Profile at artfacts.net
 Profile at the Bundesverband Bildender Künstlerinnen und Künstler, Landesverband Hessen e.V. (2007–2014)
  Solo exhibit at the Kunstverein Offenbach am Main (2014)
  Gallery representing Eva Moll in Berlin (current art)
  Gallery representing Eva Moll in New York (early and the performative work)
  „Charlies adventures in the ultraworld" by John Eischeid, Moll bei den BOS Brooklyn NY
  „Eve by Eva" by Timothy Herrik, Eva Moll at the Fish with Braids Gallery, Jersey City NJ
  Report of the "maecenia Frankfurt" 7 Schrankstipendium
  Press article regarding EVE Performance by Eva Moll at the opening of the dOCUMENTA (13), Das Marburger
  Foto stream with Eva Moll at the opening of the dOCUMENTA (13), Berliner Zeitung
  Foto stream with Eva Moll at the opening of the dOCUMENTA (13), Wiener Zeitung
  Press article about the performance of the master class of Eva Moll at the Akademie für interdisziplinäre Prozesse during the dOCUMENTA (13) in Kassel 2012
  SchirnMag reports about the benefit auction curated by Eva Moll
   Listed artist at the Art Hamptons trade fair, Bridgehampton NY 2013

Living people
1975 births
German contemporary artists
Artists from Karlsruhe
Artists from New York City
Artists from Berlin